The State Register of Heritage Places is maintained by the Heritage Council of Western Australia. , 139 places are heritage-listed in the Shire of Bridgetown-Greenbushes, of which twelve are on the State Register of Heritage Places.

List
The Western Australian State Register of Heritage Places, lists the following twelve state registered places within the Shire of Bridgetown-Greenbushes:

References

Bridgetown
 
Bridgetown